Four for the Show is the twenty-eighth studio album by American country music group The Statler Brothers. It was released in 1986 via Mercury Records. The album peaked at number 7 on the Billboard Top Country Albums chart.

Track listing
"Count On Me" (Don Reid) – 2:27
"You Oughta Be Here with Me" (Roger Miller) – 3:06
"We Got the Mem'ries" (Don Reid, Harold Reid) – 3:03
"I Don't Dream Anymore" (Don Reid, Debo Reid) – 2:32
"Forever" (Jimmy Fortune) – 2:57
"Only You" (Buck Ram) – 2:58
"For Cryin' Out Loud" (John Rimel, Fortune) – 3:04
"Will You Be There?" (Don Reid, Debo Reid) – 2:41
"I Believe I'll Live for Him" (Don Reid, H. Reid) - 2:40
"More Like Daddy Than Me" (Don Reid) - 3:35

Personnel
Mike Leech - bass
Gene Chrisman, Jerry Carrigan - drums
Hoot Hester - fiddle
Ray Edenton, Jerry Kennedy, Pete Wade, Chip Young - guitar
David Briggs, Larry Butler - keyboards
Weldon Myrick - steel guitar
The Nashville String Machine - strings; arranged by Bergen White

Charts

Weekly charts

Year-end charts

References

1986 albums
The Statler Brothers albums
Mercury Records albums
Albums produced by Jerry Kennedy